Orlando Peçanha de Carvalho (20 September 1935 – 10 February 2010), sometimes known simply as Orlando, was a Brazilian footballer who played defender.

During his club career he played for Vasco da Gama (1955–1960), Boca Juniors (1960–1964) and Santos (1965–1967). He was part of the Brazilian team that won the 1958 FIFA World Cup, and also participated in the 1966 FIFA World Cup as the vice captain of the team. In total he earned 31 caps.

Orlando died on 10 February 2010, in Rio de Janeiro, due to a heart attack.

Boca Juniors
During his time with Boca he played 119 games for the club, (105 league and 14 Copa Libertadores), he never scored a goal for the club but he had the distinction of being the club captain and he helped them to win two league titles in 1962 and 1964. His third league title was in 1965, playing for Santos.

References

External links

Boca Juniors statistics 

1935 births
2010 deaths
Sportspeople from Niterói
Brazilian footballers
Brazilian football managers
Association football defenders
1958 FIFA World Cup players
1966 FIFA World Cup players
FIFA World Cup-winning players
Expatriate footballers in Argentina
Expatriate football managers in Kuwait
Campeonato Brasileiro Série A players
Argentine Primera División players
Campeonato Brasileiro Série A managers
Brazilian expatriate footballers
Brazilian expatriate football managers
Brazil international footballers
CR Vasco da Gama players
Boca Juniors footballers
Santos FC players
Fluminense de Feira Futebol Clube managers
Centro Sportivo Alagoano managers
América Futebol Clube (SP) managers
Rio Preto Esporte Clube managers
Joinville Esporte Clube managers
Esporte Clube Vitória managers
Kazma SC managers
Esporte Clube Taubaté managers
Galícia Esporte Clube managers
Kuwait Premier League managers
Brazilian expatriate sportspeople in Kuwait
Brazilian expatriate sportspeople in Argentina